USS Mitchell (DE-43) was an  constructed for the United States Navy during World War II. She was sent off into the Pacific Ocean to protect convoys and other ships from Japanese submarines and fighter aircraft. She performed escort and anti-submarine operations in dangerous battle areas and was awarded nine battle stars, a very high number for a ship of her type.

She was originally laid down as BDE-43 on 12 January 1943 by the Puget Sound Navy Yard for transfer to the United Kingdom upon completion. However, she was ordered retained for service in the U.S. Navy. She was reclassified DE-43 on 16 June; named Mitchell on 23 June; launched on 1 August 1943; sponsored by Mrs. Albert E. Mitchell, widow of Ensign Mitchell; and commissioned on 17 November 1943.

Namesake
Albert Edward Mitchell was born on 25 December 1914 in Seattle, Washington. He attended the University of Washington and then enlisted in the Navy as a seaman second class on 20 December 1940 for flight training at Seattle and Corpus Christi, where he was designated a naval aviator on 30 September 1941 and commissioned an Ensign. While assigned to Patrol Squadron 42, he was killed in action in June 1942 somewhere over Unimak Pass in the Aleutian Islands while battling invading Japanese forces in what would be known as the Battle of Dutch Harbor. He was posthumously awarded the Distinguished Flying Cross for "extraordinary achievement while participating in aerial flight." In his commendation, it was stated that "although he himself was killed when his plane crashed, he made possible the capture of a Mitsubishi fighter which provided new and invaluable information on this type of enemy aircraft." His remains and aircraft have never been recovered.

World War II Pacific Theatre Operations
After shakedown and training off San Diego, California, Mitchell participated in the "Battle of San Clemente", a simulated invasion San Clemente Island off the coast of Los Angeles, California. The simulation was designed to be a "dress rehearsal" for the invasion of the Marshall Islands. Mitchell then sailed on 2 February 1944 as part of the escort of a convoy of eight liberty ships sailing to Hawaii. Arriving Pearl Harbor on 10 February, Mitchell spent the next four months operating with American submarines in Task Force 16, Service Force Pacific Fleet.

Supporting the Battle of Guam 
On 28 July 1944, Mitchell escorted an oiler to Agat Bay, Guam, to aid naval forces in the Battle of Guam (1944). The crew looked on as cruisers and destroyers shelled the beach and ridge, while dive bombers attacked the Orote Peninsula. The American forces would go on to recapture the island, and Mitchell was awarded its first battlestar for its support role.

Crossing the Line Ceremony 
August 1944 Mitchell was assigned to the Third Fleet Logistics Group as part of a screen for oilers and escort carriers. On 30 August 1944, Mitchell made its first of many crossings of the Equator. When this happens, a line-crossing ceremony is held on deck to honor both the crew and "Neptunus Rex", also known as King Neptune, ancient Roman god of the sea. Prior to crossing the Equator, a sailor is colloquially referred to as a "pollywog"; during this ceremony, all polliwogs are "promoted" to shellbacks, and formally welcomed into Neptune's realm.

First Visit to Ulithi Atoll 
In November 1944, Mitchell made its first of many visits to the naval base at Ulithi Atoll, located in the Caroline Islands. At the time, Ulithi served as the forward operating base for the US Navy Pacific Operations; its harbor could fit up to 700 ships at once, a capacity that surpasses both Pearl Harbor and Majuro. Repair ships, distilling ships, ice cream barges, and floating dry docks filled the central harbor. Mog Mog island, in the north of the atoll, served as a recreation center for the men on the island; baseball fields, an outdoor theater, a 500-seat chapel, and other facilities were constructed. After the capture of Leyte Gulf in October 1944, the Navy began moving its forward operations base to the Philippines and Ulithi was slowly abandoned by the Navy and soon forgotten. Although few civilians ever heard of Ulithi or the vital role it played, for approximately 7 months Ulithi served as the busiest anchorage in the world and was pivotal in the American victory in the Pacific.

Collision With a Whale 

On 3 December 1944 Mitchell struck a whale while operating northeast of Luzon, screening ships and sinking mines. The collision seriously damaged her underwater sound equipment and forced her to retire back to Ulithi for repairs in floating drydock auxiliary repair dock USS ARD-15. Such an accident was common for Navy ships during World War 2, in both the Pacific and Atlantic oceans.

Supporting Iwo Jima and Okinawa Operations
 
Mitchell was soon back in action; on 21 February 1945 her deck log reported: "Steaming toward rendezvous point southeast of Iwo Jima." As U.S. Marines landed on Okinawa under cover of naval gunfire, Mitchell performed escort and patrol missions.

Invasion of Borneo
A few weeks later she was a screening vessel in Rear Admiral W. D. Sample's Task Group 78.4 which attacked and occupied Balikpapan, Borneo, on 6 July 1945.

End-of-War Operations
 
As part of Task Group 30.8, she then helped to protect convoys supplying the occupation of Japan during the months of August and September 1945. On 5 September Mitchell briefly joined American ships in Tokyo Harbor. She weighed anchor on the 18th for the United States via Eniwetok and Pearl Harbor, arriving San Francisco on 8 October.

Post-War Inactivation and Decommissioning 
 
Her last time underway as a commissioned naval vessel was on 6 November when she moved to Kaiser's Victory Yard, Richmond, California. Mitchell was decommissioned there and struck from the Navy List on 29 December 1945. She was sold for scrapping and delivered to the purchaser, Puget Sound Navigation Co., Seattle, Washington, on 11 December 1946.  Her engines were used to power the MV Evergreen State, operated by Washington State Ferries from 1954 to 2015.

Honors and awards 
Mitchell received nine battle stars for World War II service.

See also 
 USS Slater, a museum ship in Albany, NY dedicated to the history of destroyer escorts including Mitchell

References

External links

 

Evarts-class destroyer escorts
Ships built in Vancouver, Washington
Whale collisions with ships
1943 ships
World War II frigates and destroyer escorts of the United States